St. Ambrose Church is a parish of the Roman Catholic Church in West Hollywood, California. The current parish church is located at 1281 North Fairfax Avenue.

History
The parish was organized by Fr. Thomas N. O'Toole in 1922, and held its first services at the former Granada Theatre near Sunset and Gardner Street on November 26. Work on a permanent church, designed by architect Ross Montgomery, began in 1923, with the first services held on Easter Sunday, April 20, 1924. It was dedicated by Archbishop John Joseph Cantwell on May 18, 1924.

The growing congregation acquired the adjacent land in 1929, on which it opened a parochial school in 1935, a convent in 1937, and a rectory in 1949. Construction on the current church began in 1950, and Archbishop James Francis McIntyre presided over the dedication of the current church on May 20, 1951.

As a child, Roger Wagner (1914-1992) was an organist in this church.

Francesca Hilton's funeral was held at the church.

References

External link
 

Roman Catholic churches in California
Buildings and structures in West Hollywood, California
Churches in Los Angeles County, California
Christian organizations established in 1922
Roman Catholic churches completed in 1951
Roman Catholic Archdiocese of Los Angeles
20th-century Roman Catholic church buildings in the United States